Yvonne Harrison Castro (born December 2, 1975 in New York City) is a Puerto Rican track and field runner. She has participated at many international events. She is currently an assistant sprint coach at Saint Joseph’s University alongside Michael Glavin.

Biography
Harrison's name became a household name in Puerto Rico in part because of the coverage given to her career by local newspapers such as El Vocero and El Nuevo Dia, which follow her accomplishments and doings almost on a daily basis.

She finished in seventh place at the Rio de Janeiro Grand Prix of Athleticism. After a competition in Osaka, Japan, she sustained an injury that required her to take a rest from competition for a while.

Harrison went to Texas to train for the 2004 Olympics in Athens, Greece. According to her trainer, Victor Lopez, she was making an excellent running time during the training in Texas.

About two weeks before the Olympics, she travelled to Seville, Spain, where she finished her Olympic training.

Harrison's participation at the 2004 Olympic Games was her first participation in such an event.
...

Achievements

See also
List of Puerto Ricans

References

External links
 
 

1975 births
Living people
Track and field athletes from New York City
American female hurdlers
Olympic track and field athletes of Puerto Rico
Puerto Rican female hurdlers
Athletes (track and field) at the 2004 Summer Olympics
Central American and Caribbean Games gold medalists for Puerto Rico
Competitors at the 2002 Central American and Caribbean Games
Central American and Caribbean Games medalists in athletics